The 2012–13 Isle of Man League is the 104th season of the Isle of Man Football League on the Isle of Man.

League tables

Premier League

Division 2

Cups

FA Cup

St Marys   2–1    St Georges

Railway Cup
St Georges   4–2    St Johns United

Charity Shield
St Georges   2–1    St Marys

Hospital Cup
St Georges   9–0    Union Mills

Woods Cup
Ayre United   7–1    Pulrose United

References
FA Full Time – IOM Football League 2012–13

Isle of Man Football League seasons
Man
Foot
Foot